The Minister of Foreign Affairs of the Republic of Kazakhstan (Qazaqstan Respublikasynyñ Syrtqy ıster ministrı; Russian. Министр иностранных дел Республики Казахстан) is an official in the Government of the Republic of Kazakhstan, responsible for ensuring the implementation of foreign policy. He/She heads the Ministry of Foreign Affairs. The President of the Republic of Kazakhstan can independently appoint and dismiss the minister without consulting the Parliament. The current foreign minister of Kazakhstan is Mūhtar Tıleuberdı.

Functions

The Minister of Foreign Affairs of the Republic of Kazakhstan operates relying on the Regulation on the Ministry of Foreign Affairs of the Republic of Kazakhstan approved by the Decree of the Government of the Republic of Kazakhstan No. 1118, dated October 28, 2004. The Minister is authorized to represent the Republic of Kazakhstan in relations with foreign states and international organizations within its competence, represents the Ministry in state bodies and other organizations. He also determines the duties and powers of deputies, appoints to positions and dismisses, promotes and imposes disciplinary penalties on the staff of the diplomatic service, determines the need for personnel of diplomatic service bodies, exercises other powers in accordance with the legislation of the Republic of Kazakhstan.

History 
The position of the head of a foreign affairs office on Kazakh territory was first documented during the period of existence of the Turkestan Autonomous Soviet Socialist Republic, which was created in the initial period after the October Revolution of 1917. This position was called the People's Commissar for Foreign Affairs of the Turkestan ASSR, whose activities were regulated by the Regulations on the Commissariat of Foreign Affairs of the Turkestan Republic in the Russian Federation. The functional duties of the People's Commissar for Foreign Affairs of the Turkestan ASSR included political relations with foreign governments, patronage in foreign lands to trade and the interests of the republic, an application for the lawful protection of the citizens of the republic abroad. The position of the Minister for Foreign Affairs in the modern sense appeared in February 1944 after the adoption of the USSR Law «On Submission of Powers to the Union Republics in the Field of Foreign Relations and on the Transformation of the People's Commissariat of Foreign Affairs from the All-Union into Union-Republic People’s Commissariat». By then, all of the Union republics of the USSE gained the right to enter into direct relations with foreign states, with the Minister of Foreign Affairs of the USSR performing all of the main foreign policy functions. Between 1944–1974, the office also concurrently served as the office of the Deputy Chairmen of the Council of Ministers of the Kazakh SSR. The position of Kazakhstan's foreign minister in its current form was established in 1991 after the Kazakh SSR changed its name to the Republic of Kazakhstan and gained its independence from the Soviet Union.

List of Ministers
This is a list of the Ministers of Foreign Affairs of Kazakhstan.

References

Government of Kazakhstan